Hassan Kadhim Ali (born 1 July 1953) is an Iraqi former hurdler who competed in the 1980 Summer Olympics.

References

1953 births
Living people
Iraqi male hurdlers
Olympic athletes of Iraq
Athletes (track and field) at the 1980 Summer Olympics
Asian Games medalists in athletics (track and field)
Athletes (track and field) at the 1978 Asian Games
Asian Games gold medalists for Iraq
Asian Games bronze medalists for Iraq
Medalists at the 1978 Asian Games